The 14th District of the Iowa Senate is located in southern Iowa, and is currently composed of Clarke, Decatur, Jasper, Lucas, Marion, and Wayne Counties.

Current elected officials
Amy Sinclair is the senator currently representing the 14th District.

The area of the 14th District contains two Iowa House of Representatives districts:
The 27th District (represented by Joel Fry)
The 28th District (represented by Jon Thorup)

The district is also located in Iowa's 2nd congressional district, which is represented by U.S. Representative Mariannette Miller-Meeks.

Past senators
The district has previously been represented by:

James Gallagher, 1983–1984
Larry Murphy, 1985–1996
Kitty Rehberg, 1997–2002
Mike Connolly, 2003–2008
Pam Jochum, 2009–2012
Amy Sinclair, 2013–present

See also
Iowa General Assembly
Iowa Senate

References

14